Glucosamine—fructose-6-phosphate aminotransferase isomerizing 1 is an enzyme that in humans is encoded by the GFPT1 gene.

Glutamine-fructose-6-phosphate transaminase 1 is the first and rate-limiting enzyme of the hexosamine pathway.  GFAT controls the flux of glucose into the hexosamine pathway and catalyzes the formation of glucosamine 6-phosphate.

References

Further reading